Stagecoach Bluebird (also known by its legal operating name Bluebird Buses Ltd, and formerly Northern Scottish Omnibuses Ltd) is a Scottish bus company which operates bus services in the areas of Aberdeen, Aberdeenshire and Moray. It is a subsidiary of the Stagecoach Group.

The company held a royal warrant granted by Elizabeth II for bus and coach services in 1996, which expired with the death of Elizabeth II in 2022.

Operation
From its head office on Guild Street, Aberdeen, Stagecoach Bluebird covers an operating range stretching over Aberdeen City, Aberdeenshire and Moray.

It is the largest operator in the north east of Scotland and is responsible for urban, rural and interurban services in the towns of Alford, Ballater, Braemar, Buckie, Elgin, Forres, Fraserburgh, Fyvie, Macduff, Mintlaw, Peterhead and Stonehaven as well as city services in Aberdeen.  Depots are also located in these towns.

Bluebird also provide coaches for Scottish Citylink services, mainly from Aberdeen to Perth, Dundee, Glasgow and Edinburgh.

History
The company was formed as Northern Scottish Omnibuses Ltd in June 1985 from the northern operations of W. Alexander & Sons (Northern) Ltd, then a member of the Scottish Bus Group. The southern operations in Blairgowrie, Arbroath, Montrose, Forfar and Dundee were ceded to a new company, Strathtay Scottish, now Stagecoach Strathtay.

From its creation, the company retained the traditional yellow and cream livery from its SBG predecessor.

On the approach to deregulation of the British bus industry in 1986, Northern had a working relationship with Aberdeen city operator Grampian Regional Transport, and operated some services together under the Grampian Scottish name. However, the co-operation would be short lived, and upon deregulation Northern Scottish launched a network of services throughout Aberdeen under the CityBus brand and adopting dual-door double deckers, non-standard for Northern but common with Grampian. A livery was adopted for the CityBus operation incorporating large areas of blue. In response, Grampian would extend its operations outwith Aberdeen and into Northern's rural operating base.

Outside Aberdeen, Northern saw little to no competition, thanks in part to its largely rural and remote territory.

Toward privatisation the company resurrected the classic bluebird logo that was once used by Walter Alexander for its coaching operations. Midland Scottish, itself a fellow SBG subsidiary and once also part of the Alexander's company, had continued to use the same logo, and as it rebranded itself as Midland Bluebird, Northern Scottish began trading as Bluebird Northern. Some vehicles operated in the Elgin area were, however, branded as Moray Bluebird, whilst those operating in the Peterhead and Fraserburgh areas were branded Buchan Bluebird.

Though its operations remained largely the same since its formation in 1985 (and earlier) and with little competition, Northern Scottish was not one of the most profitable of the Scottish Bus Group subsidiaries, largely due to the sparse population in its large operating area. However, the company was successfully privatised, being bought by Perth-based transport group Stagecoach for £5.7m in March 1991 in their first acquisition of a former SBG company. The yellow and cream livery was replaced with the Stagecoach corporate white with red, orange and blue stripes, and shortly after privatisation the legal company name was changed to Bluebird Buses Ltd.

In 1996, Stagecoach Bluebird were granted a royal warrant from Elizabeth II for bus and coach services. Following the closure of the Deeside Railway, which provided royal trains from Balmoral Castle to Aberdeen, in 1966, Northern and its successors provided coach transport to the castle for the royal family's summer holidays. The warrant expired with the death of Elizabeth II in 2022.

Fleet
Together with Stagecoach Highlands, as of April 2019, the combined Stagecoach North Scotland operation operates 383 buses and coaches.

References

External links
Stagecoach Bluebird website

Stagecoach Group bus operators in Scotland
Companies based in Aberdeen
Transport in Aberdeen
Transport in Aberdeenshire
Transport in Moray
1985 establishments in Scotland
Transport companies established in 1985
British Royal Warrant holders